"Händerna mot himlen" (Hands to the sky) is a song by Swedish recording artist and songwriter Petra Marklund, which was chosen as the lead single from her fifth studio album Inferno (2012). The song was released digitally on 14 September 2012, and is recorded in her native language Swedish. The song also is her first single to be released under her birth name Petra Marklund rather than her stage name September.

Background and release
On her website, September announced that she would be recording her debut Swedish studio album. The album was released on 17 October 2012. She stated "I am both pleased and a little excited to finally release this album".

In an interview with Dn.se, she officially confirmed that her next album would be under her birth name and that this studio album would depart from her signature eurodance style.  She said the tone would be "dark and personal".

On 10 September, ScandiPop.co.uk had premiered the song on their website.

Composition and critical reception
Musically, the song is pop-influenced, with Europop beats. However, the song features strong strings accompaniment, including violins, violas and cellos. ScandiPop.co.uk said the song sounded like Coldplay's Viva la Vida. Song Music said the song was "more personal and sad than before".

Händerna Mot Himlen received positive reviews from music critics.

Music video
The music video premiered on aftonbladet.se. It featured Marklund walking around Sweden and skydiving from a plane.

Track listing
 Digital Download
 "Händerna Mot Himlen" – 3:57

Charts

Weekly charts

Year-end charts

References

2012 singles
Swedish-language songs
Songs written by Joakim Berg
2012 songs
Petra Marklund songs